The duckbilled catfish, alternatively spelled as the duck-billed catfish, (Cochlefelis spatula) is a species of catfish in the family Ariidae. It was described by Edward Pierson Ramsay and James Douglas Ogilby in 1886, originally under the genus Arius. It inhabits turbid freshwater rivers in New Guinea. Its diet consists of prawns in the genera Caridina and Macrobrachium.

References

Ariidae
Fish described in 1886